Richard Watts (1529–1579) was an English businessman and MP for Rochester.

Richard Watts may also refer to:

Richard Watts (politician) (born 1975), British Labour Party politician
Richard Watts Jr. (1898–1981), theatre critic
Richard C. Watts (1853–1930), American judge

See also
Richard Watt (disambiguation)